Karelasyon is a Philippine television drama anthology broadcast by GMA Network. Hosted by Carla Abellana, it premiered on April 11, 2015 on the network's Sabado Star Power line up replacing GMA Tales of Horror. The show concluded on May 13, 2017 with a total of 108 episodes. It was replaced by Tadhana in its timeslot.

The series is streaming online on YouTube.

Episodes

Ratings
According to AGB Nielsen Philippines' Mega Manila household television ratings, the pilot episode of Karelasyon earned a 16.5% rating. While the final episode scored a 5.2% rating in Nationwide Urban Television Audience Measurement People in television homes.

Accolades

References

External links
 
 

2015 Philippine television series debuts
2017 Philippine television series endings
Filipino-language television shows
GMA Network original programming
GMA Integrated News and Public Affairs shows
Philippine anthology television series
Television shows set in the Philippines